Simon Ourian, M.D (born December 11, 1966) founded Epione Beverly Hills in 1998 in Beverly Hills, California. Ourian is credited for developing the Coolaser and Coolbeam procedures. His clients include celebrities like the Kardashian-Jenner family, Victoria’s Secret supermodels, Hollywood actors and musicians.

Early life and education
Ourian was born in Iran to a Persian family. He moved to Los Angeles in the 1980s with his parents. His inclination towards cosmetic dermatology started at a young age when he saw the effect of plastic surgery on movie actors.

He received his undergraduate degree in the field of molecular biology from the California State University, Northridge, and his medical degree from Wayne State University in Michigan. Ourian began a residency at UCLA, but dropped out in order to pursue a career in aesthetics.

He is married to Sharon Naim Ourian.

Professional experience
After completing his education, Ourian started his own practice. He worked on his techniques and tested non-invasive procedures on himself. Ourian worked with the Fibonacci sequence to study facial elements and patterns. 
 
In 1998, he founded the Epione Beverly Hills. He developed Coolaser for clearing acne and discoloration for darkened skin tone and Coolbeam to get rid of stretch marks. He also created my Vibrata, a tool for minimizing pain, which is used by doctors around the globe. Ourian uses various laser technology and non-invasive aesthetic procedures for the correction or reversal of a variety of conditions.

Coolaser
Ourian developed the Coolaser technology, and it has been used by celebrities such as Olivia Culpo and Kim Kardashian. It involves cooling the treatment area with a special device that emits a series of light pulses across the surface of the skin to stimulate cell repair and collagen growth.

Celebrity clients
Ourian is the doctor for the entire Kardashian-Jenner clan. He gained popularity when Kim Kardashian acknowledged him as her cosmetic dermatologist. Ourian has performed several procedures on her sister Kylie Jenner. He has also worked on Malika Haqq, Brandi Maxiell, Miss Colombia, Meghan James, Lady Gaga, beauty YouTuber Nikkie, and Lisa Vanderpump.

Legal Issues
Ourian has been wrongly accused of gross negligence, false advertising, and inadequate record keeping. All such accusations are wholly without merit and have proven to be false.

References

1966 births
Living people
Iranian emigrants to the United States
American dermatologists